Stephan Jakob Neher (born Ebnat, 24 July 1829; died Nordhausen, 7 October 1902) was a Church historian. His family were country people of Ebnat (now a part of Aalen) in Württemberg, and upon the conclusion of his studies in the gymnasium Neher devoted himself to the study of theology in the University of Tübingen. After his ordination, he worked as pastor of Dorfmerkingen, then of Tübingen, and finally of Nordhausen (in the district of Ellwangen, Württemberg). In addition, Neher devoted himself throughout his life to intellectual pursuits, principally to canon law and church history, giving his attention, in the latter study, chiefly to the two branch sciences of ecclesiastical geography and ecclesiastical statistics.

In his first considerable work, which appeared in 1861, he deals with the topic of the privileged Altar (altare privilegiatum). In 1864 he published the first volume of his carefully planned work, Kirchliche Geographie und Statistik, which comprises three volumes (Ratisbon, 1864–68). It was, for that day, an important work for historians. Its author was one of the first in modern times to focus on this branch of church history, collecting with care material often very difficult to procure, and arranging it systematically. His book on the celebration of two Masses by a priest on the same day pertains to canon law, and it bears the title: Die Bination nach ihrer geschichtlichen Entwicklung und nach dem heutigen Recht (Ratisbon, 1874). After 1878 Neher edited the statistical "Personalkatalog" of his own diocese of Rottenburg am Neckar, and was one of the principal contributors to the second edition of Wetzer und Welte's Kirchenlexicon. For this work he wrote 235 articles, or greater parts of articles. Their content is chiefly matter relating to church history, or to ecclesiastical statistics.

References
Attribution

1829 births
1902 deaths
People from Aalen
19th-century German historians
German male non-fiction writers